The Sacred Heart Church is a religious building that is affiliated with the Catholic Church and is located in the town of Jamestown on the island of Saint Helena part of the British overseas territory of Saint Helena, Ascension and Tristan da Cunha in the southern Atlantic Ocean.

This is one of 3 operating Catholic churches in that territory, the others being those located in Cat Hill, near Wideawake Airfield, in Ascension Island (Church of Our Lady of the Ascension) and the Edinburgh of the Seven Seas on the island of Tristan da Cunha (St. Joseph Church).

The first Catholic priests came to Saint Helena with Napoleon Bonaparte. In 1819. Father Antonio Bounavita and Father Ange Vignali arrived on St. Helena. Bounavita, left the island in March 1821 leaving Vignali to administer Extreme Unction to Napoleon on 5 May 1821 and conduct his burial service on 9 May. There were only sporadic visits from priests for the next thirty years. A permanent church was built in 1852 and the first resident priest arrived and it was under the jurisdiction of Apostolic Vicariate of Cape of Good Hope, Western District. The congregation is part of the constituency of the Mission sui juris of Saint Helena, Ascension and Tristan da Cunha (Missio sui iuris Sanctae Helenae, Ascensionis et Tristanensis) which was created in 1986 under the pontificate of Pope John Paul II.

See also
Roman Catholicism in Saint Helena
Sacred Heart Church (disambiguation)

References

Roman Catholic churches in Saint Helena, Ascension and Tristan da Cunha
Church buildings in Saint Helena
Catholic Church in Saint Helena
Roman Catholic churches completed in 1852
Jamestown, Saint Helena
1852 establishments in the British Empire
19th-century Roman Catholic church buildings in the United Kingdom